This is a list of Romanian writers.

Literature

Old literature
Neagoe Basarab (c. 1459–1521)
Dosoftei (1624–1693)
Miron Costin (1633–1691) 
Grigore Ureche (1590–1647)
Ion Neculce (1672–1744)
Antim Ivireanul (1650–1717)
Constantin Cantacuzino (1639–1716)
Dimitrie Cantemir (1673–1723)
Gheorghe Asachi (1788–1869)

19th century

Romantic writers
Dinicu Golescu (1777–1830)
Anton Pann (1790s–1854)
Ion Heliade-Rădulescu (1802–1872)
Grigore Alexandrescu (1810–1885)
Constantin Negruzzi (1808–1868)
Ion Ghica (1817–1897)
Nicolae Filimon (1819–1865)
Alexandru Odobescu (1834–1895)
Bogdan Petriceicu-Hasdeu (1838–1907)
Petre Ispirescu (1830–1887) 
Alexandru Odobescu (1834–1895)
Alecu Russo (1819–1859)
Cezar Bolliac (1813–1881)
Barbu Delavrancea (1858–1918)
Octavian Goga (1881–1938)
Vasile Alecsandri (1821–1890)
Alexandru Macedonski (1854–1920)
George Coșbuc (1866–1918)

The classics
Ion Creangă (1839–1889) 
Ioan Slavici (1848–1925)
Mihai Eminescu (1850–1889)
Ion Luca Caragiale (1852–1912)

Inter-war literature

Transition literature
Duiliu Zamfirescu (1858–1922)
Alexandru Davila (1862–1929)
Gala Galaction (1879–1961)
Constantin Stere (1865–1936)
Nicolae Iorga (1871–1940)
George Topîrceanu (1886–1937)

Analytical prose
Anton Holban (1902–1937) 
Gib Mihăescu (1894–1935)
Hortensia Papadat-Bengescu (1876–1955)
Camil Petrescu (1894–1957)
Mihail Sebastian (1907–1945)

Realist prose
Ion Marin Sadoveanu (1893–1964)
Eugeniu Botez (1877–1933)
Eugen Lovinescu (1881–1943)
Cezar Petrescu (1892–1961) 
Liviu Rebreanu (1885–1944)
Mihail Sadoveanu (1889–1961)
Vasile Voiculescu (1884–1963)
George Călinescu (1899–1965)
Zaharia Stancu (1902–1974)

Poetic novels
Tudor Arghezi (1880–1967)
Mateiu Caragiale (1885–1936)

Fantastic prose
Mircea Eliade (1907–1986) 
Max Blecher (1909–1938)
Vasile Voiculescu (1884–1963)
Gellu Naum (1915–2001)
Doina Ruști (born 1957)

Great poets
George Bacovia (1881–1957)
Tudor Arghezi (1880–1967)
Ion Barbu (1895–1961)
Lucian Blaga (1895–1961)
Ion Vinea (1895–1964)
Ion Pillat (1891–1945)
Ion Minulescu (1881–1944)

Others
Urmuz (1883–1923) 
Ion Grămadă (1886–1917)
Panait Istrati (1884–1935) 
Ionel Teodoreanu (1897–1954) 
Victor Eftimiu (1889–1972)
Tudor Mușatescu (1903–1970) 
George Ciprian (1883–1968)
Geo Bogza (1908–1993)
Eugène Ionesco (1909–1994) 
Emil Cioran (1911–1995)
Martha Bibescu (1886–1973)
Elena Văcărescu (1864–1947)

Post-war period

Mainstream prose
Radu Tudoran (1910–1992)
Eugen Jebeleanu (1911–1991)
Emil Botta (1911–1977)
Constantin Virgil Gheorghiu (1916–1992)
Gellu Naum (1915–2001)
Marin Preda (1922–1980)
Ștefan Augustin Doinaș (1922–2002)
Petru Dumitriu (1924–2002)
Constantin Chiriţǎ (1925–1991)
A. E. Baconsky (1925–1977)
Eugen Barbu (1924–1993) 
Nicolae Breban (born 1934)
Alexandru Ivasiuc (1933–1977)
Dumitru Radu Popescu (born 1935)
Marin Preda (1922–1980) 
Dinu Săraru (born 1932)
Zaharia Stancu (1902–1974) 
Ioan Alexandru (1941–2000)
Titus Popovici (1930–1994)
Dumitru Solomon (1932–2003)
Dumitru Țepeneag (born 1937)
Doina Ruști (born 1957)
Valentin Serbu (1933–1994)

Prose
Geo Bogza (1908–1993)
Constantin Chiriță (1925–1991)
Radu Tudoran (1917–1992) 
Haralamb Zincă (1923–2008)
Doru Davidovici (1945–1989)

Poetry
Mihai Beniuc (1907–1998)
Leonid Dimov (1926–1987)
Carmen Firan (born 1958)
Nicolae Labiș (1935–1956)
Ion Pillat (1891–1945)
Marin Sorescu (1936–1996)
Nichita Stănescu (1933–1983)
Dorin Tudoran (born 1945)

Romanian diaspora
Matei Călinescu (born 1934)
Andrei Codrescu (born 1946)
Virgil Gheorghiu (1916–1992)
Paul Goma (1935–2020)
Leonard Oprea (born 1953)
Dumitru Țepeneag (born 1937)
Herta Müller (born 1953)
Bogdan Suceavă (born 1969)

Contemporary writers
Alexandru Paleologu (1919–2005)
Octavian Paler (1927–2007)
Domokos Bölöni (born 1946)
Augustin Buzura (born 1938)
Mirel Cană (1957-2020), who also wrote as Șerban Alexandru
Ionuţ Caragea (born 1975)
Mircea Cărtărescu (born 1956)
Gabriela Adameşteanu (born 1942)
Carmen-Francesca Banciu (born 1955)
T. O. Bobe (born 1969)
Rodica Bretin (born 1958)
Ioan Mihai Cochinescu (born 1951)
Ion Hobana (born 1931)
Rodica Ojog-Brașoveanu (1939–2002)
Mircea Nedelciu (1950–1999)
Leonard Oprea (born 1953)
Dora Pavel (born 1946)
Nicolae Breban (born 1934)
Filip Florian (born 1967)
Doina Ruşti (born 1957)
Radu Aldulescu (born 1954)
Dan Lungu (born 1969)
Gelu Vlaşin (born 1966)
Igor Ursenco (born 1971)
Bogdan Suceavă (born 1969)

Essays and philosophy

20th century
Constantin Rădulescu-Motru (1868–1957)
Lucian Blaga (1895–1961)
Emil Cioran (1911–1995)
Ioan Petru Culianu (1950–1991)  
Mircea Eliade (1907–1986) 
Nae Ionescu (1890–1940)
Constantin Noica (1909–1987)
Nicolae Steinhardt (1912–1989)
Petre Țuțea (1902–1991)
Mircea Vulcănescu (1904–1952)

Contemporary
Sorin Antohi (born 1957)
Gabriel Liiceanu (born 1942)
Andrei Pleșu (born 1948)
Doina Ruști (born 1957)
Bogdan Suceavă (born 1969)

Literary criticism
Titu Maiorescu (1840–1917)
Eugen Lovinescu (1881–1946)
George Călinescu (1889–1965)
Tudor Vianu (1897–1964)
Șerban Cioculescu (1902–1988)
Nicolae Manolescu (born 1939)
Virgil Nemoianu (born 1940)

Drama
Ion Luca Caragiale (1852–1912)
Eugène Ionesco (1909–1994)
Mihail Sebastian (1907–1945) 
Tudor Mușatescu (1930–1980)
Marin Sorescu (1936–1997)

See also
Literature of Romania
List of Romanian women writers
List of Romanian language poets
List of Romanian novelists
List of Romanian playwrights

Romania
Writers